Boonesville is an unincorporated community in Albemarle County, Virginia, United States.

References

Unincorporated communities in Albemarle County, Virginia